Oliver Raymond (c.1605 – 1679) was an English politician who sat in the House of Commons in 1654 and 1656.

Raymond was born at Belchamp Walter, Essex, the son of John Raymond, who bought Belchamp Hall in 1611. He was admitted at Trinity College, Cambridge in 1622 and migrated to Christ's College, Cambridge. He was admitted at Lincoln's Inn on 11 February 1626 and called to the bar in 1633. He was elder for Essex Classis in 1647.

In 1654, Raymond was elected Member of Parliament for Essex  in the First Protectorate Parliament. He was re-elected MP for Essex in 1656 for the Second Protectorate Parliament.

Raymond died in 1679 and was buried at Belchamp Walter. He had married Frances Herries, daughter of Sir William Herries (or Harris) of Shenfield, Essex. he disinherited his eldest son for marrying without his approval and Belchamp Hall passed instead to the latters's eldest son John Raymond (died 1690).

References

1679 deaths
People from Braintree District
Alumni of Trinity College, Cambridge
Alumni of Christ's College, Cambridge
Members of Lincoln's Inn
English MPs 1654–1655
English MPs 1656–1658
Year of birth uncertain